Two Girls Wanted, also known as 2 Girls Wanted, is a 1927 American silent comedy film directed by Alfred E. Green and starring Janet Gaynor, Glenn Tryon and Ben Bard.

Cast
 Janet Gaynor as Marianna Wright  
 Glenn Tryon as Dexter Wright  
 Ben Bard as Jack Terry  
 Joseph Cawthorn as Philip Hancock
 Billy Bletcher as Johnny  
 Doris Lloyd as Miss Timoney  
 Pauline Neff as Mrs. Delafield  
 C.L. Sherwood as Michael  
 Alyce Mills as Edna Delafield  
 Marie Mosquini as Sarah Miller  
 William H. Tooker as William Moody

See also
1937 Fox vault fire

Preservation status
This film is now lost.

References

Bibliography
 Solomon, Aubrey. The Fox Film Corporation, 1915-1935: A History and Filmography. McFarland, 2011.

External links

1927 films
1927 comedy films
Silent American comedy films
Films directed by Alfred E. Green
American silent feature films
1920s English-language films
Fox Film films
American black-and-white films
Lost American films
Lost comedy films
1927 lost films
1920s American films